XbaI is a restriction enzyme isolated from the bacterium Xanthomonas badrii

References

Restriction enzymes